The Amazing Race 28 is the twenty-eighth season of the American reality television show The Amazing Race. It featured eleven teams consisting of two notable social media personalities competing in a race around the world.

The season premiered on CBS on February 12, 2016, and the season finale aired on May 13, 2016.

Engaged choreographers Dana Borriello and Matt Steffanina were the winners of this season, while mother and son pair Sheri and Cole LaBrant finished in second place, and best friends Tyler Oakley and Korey Kuhl finished in third.

Production

Development and filming
 
Filming of The Amazing Race 28 began on November 15, 2015, with host Phil Keoghan broadcasting each team's arrival at the first clue location, the Monumento a la Revolución in Mexico City, via social media. Unlike previous seasons, the season began in the teams' hometowns rather than at a traditional starting line.

Phil Keoghan stated that the use of social media stars was considered a "social experiment" attempting to bridge the gap between long-time fans of the show and younger viewers who may not have been born when the show debuted in 2001. Keoghan stated that bringing in contestants whom younger viewers may be more familiar with, particularly when promoted over social media, generated interest in earlier seasons of the show. Executive producer Bertram van Munster stated that the use of social media stars was also something suggested by CBS, due to the fact that CBS wanted to see the show to gain more involvement with social media.

Cast

The cast consisted of Internet celebrities and their relatives and friends. Most of the cast had achieved prior fame through social media platforms, such as YouTube, Vine, and Instagram.

Future appearances
Tyler & Korey returned to compete on The Amazing Race: Reality Showdown.

On May 25, 2016, Tyler & Korey and Erin & Joslyn appeared on an Amazing Race-themed primetime special episode of The Price is Right. On August 7, 2018, Tyler & Korey competed together on a social media-themed episode of Fear Factor.

Results
The following teams are listed with their placements in each leg. Placements are listed in finishing order. 
A  placement with a dagger indicates that the team was eliminated. 
An  placement with a double-dagger indicates that the team was the last to arrive at a pit stop in a non-elimination leg, and had to perform a Speed Bump task in the following leg. 
An italicized and underlined placement indicates that the team was the last to arrive at a pit stop, but there was no rest period at the pit stop and all teams were instructed to continue racing. There was no required Speed Bump task in the next leg.
 A  indicates that the team used an Express Pass on that leg to bypass one of their tasks.
 A  indicates that the team used the U-Turn and a  indicates the team on the receiving end of the U-Turn.

Notes

Race summary

Leg 1 (United States → Mexico)

Episode 1: "I Should've Been a Boy Scout" (February 12, 2016)
Prize:   each (awarded to Dana & Matt)
Locations
Assorted Cities (Teams' Homes) (Start)
 Los Angeles, California  Dallas, Texas  Atlanta, Georgia → Mexico City, Mexico
Mexico City (Monumento a la Revolución) 
Mexico City (Plaza Garibaldi & Escuela de Mariachi Ollin Yoliztli Garibaldi  Humboldt Parking Garage) 
San Juan Teotihuacán (Parque Temático Tlalocan – Cuevas de Teotihuacan) 
Mexico City (Museo Soumaya) 
Episode summary
Instead of a traditional starting line, teams received a video message from Phil Keoghan at their homes informing them that the season had already begun. Teams had to travel to their nearest airport and fly to Mexico City, Mexico. Once in Mexico City, teams had to make their way to the Monumento a la Revolución in order to find their first clue.
 This season's first Detour was a choice between Mariachi Madness or Great Bulls of Fire. In Mariachi Madness, teams had to search among 350 Mariachi performers at Plaza Garibaldi for one who was faking their performance and then take the performer to a judge in order to receive their next clue. In Great Bulls of Fire, teams had to properly assemble the frame for a torito, a papier-mâché bull, as part of a fireworks display and then light it up in order to receive their next clue.
After completing the Detour, teams were instructed to go to the Cuevas de Teotihuacan at the Parque Temático Tlalocan and pick one of three departure times the next morning.
 In this season's first Roadblock, one team member had to search through the caves for an archeological site and dig up thirteen pieces of a Teotihuacano mask. The site contained pieces for two masks, so team members had to figure out which pieces they needed to find so they could properly assemble one mask and receive their next clue.
Teams had to check in at the pit stop: the Museo Soumaya in Mexico City.
Additional notes
This was a non-elimination leg.

Leg 2 (Mexico → Colombia)

Episode 2: "You Look Like Gollum" (February 19, 2016)
Prize: A trip for two to Saint Thomas, U.S. Virgin Islands (awarded to Tyler & Korey)
Eliminated: Marty & Hagan
Locations
Mexico City (Museo Soumaya) 
 Mexico City → Cartagena, Colombia
Santa Catalina (El Totumo) 
Manzanillo del Mar (Terraza Melló Farándula Jugos Naturales)
Manzanillo del Mar (Playa del Ora)  
Cartagena (Plaza Bolívar ) 
Episode summary
At the beginning of this leg, teams were instructed to fly to Cartagena, Colombia. Once in Cartagena, teams had to travel to El Totumo in Santa Catalina, where they found their next clue.
 In this leg's Roadblock, one team member had to climb into the mud bath atop El Totumo Volcano and find one of several satchels which contained an emerald. They had to wash the emerald before giving it to a judge, who directed them to swim to their next clue in a nearby lagoon.
After completing the Roadblock, teams had to go to Manzanillo del Mar and look for a juice stand named Terraza Melló Farándula Jugos Naturales. Once there, they had to find some locals playing dominoes, who gave them their next clue.
 For their Speed Bump, Scott & Blair had to help local fishermen haul a large dragnet out of the water and then collect all of the fish captured before they could continue racing.
 This leg's Detour was a choice between Pop-Up or Parrilla. In Pop-Up, teams had to properly assemble a shelter using the provided materials and following a pre-assembled example. Once it was built to the judge's approval, they had to guide a car into the shelter, after which they could receive their next clue. In Parrilla, teams had to properly cook three fish dishes on a parrilla grill. Once their dishes were approved, they had to serve them to nearby locals in order to receive their next clue.
Teams had to check in at the pit stop: Plaza Bolívar in Cartagena.

Leg 3 (Colombia)

Episode 3: "Bros Being Jocks" (February 26, 2016)
Prize: A trip for two to Mykonos, Greece (awarded to Brodie & Kurt)
Eliminated: Darius & Cameron
Locations
Cartagena (Plaza Bolívar ) 
Cartagena (Plaza San Diego)
Cartagena (Castillo San Felipe de Barajas)
Cartagena (Avenida El Lago  Restaurante y Cancha de Tejo Ciracari) 
Cartagena (Calle San Juan de Dios – Museo Naval del Caribe) 
Cartagena (Baluarte de Santiago) 
Episode summary
At the beginning of this leg, teams had to make their way to Plaza San Diego in Cartagena. There, teams had to search by a group of pollera dancers for their next clue, which directed them to Castillo San Felipe de Barajas. Teams had to search the catacombs for their next clue.
 This leg's Detour was a choice between Tickets or Tejo. In Tickets, teams had to work as bus conductors on a Cartagena transit bus and attract enough passengers in order to earn at least COL$20,000 (roughly $6.00), which they could trade for their next clue. In Tejo, teams had to play tejo, Colombia's national sport, which involves hitting gunpowder-loaded targets with a stone disc, and hit three targets in order to receive their next clue.
After completing the Detour, teams had to travel to Calle San Juan de Dios and find a local mochila vendor outside the Museo Naval del Caribe, who had their next clue.
 In this leg's Roadblock, one team member had to pick a mochila, a traditional Colombian knapsack, and search for other vendors between Plaza Santa Teresa and Plaza Santo Domingo to find two bags tagged with the same designer out of hundreds on display, which they could trade for their next clue.
Teams had to check in at the pit stop: the Baluarte de Santiago in Cartagena.

Leg 4 (Colombia → Switzerland → France)

Episode 4: "Get It Trending" (March 4, 2016)
Prize:  each (awarded to Brodie & Kurt)
Eliminated: Brittany & Jessica
Locations
Cartagena (Baluarte de Santiago) 
 Cartagena → Geneva, Switzerland
Geneva (Jet d'Eau)
Geneva (Chocolats Rohr)
Geneva (Victorinox Flagship Store  Promenade de la Treille ) 
Geneva (Broken Chair)
Geneva (Palace of Nations) 
 Geneva → Chamonix, France
Chamonix (Place du Triangle de l'Amitié) 
Episode summary
At the beginning of this leg, teams were instructed to fly to Geneva, Switzerland. Once in Geneva, teams had to travel to the Jet d'Eau in order to receive their next clue. Teams were instructed to go to Chocolats Rohr and pick a number, which determined the order of their departure the next morning.
 This leg's Detour was a choice between Work Bench or Bench Work. In Work Bench, teams had to correctly assemble a Victorinox Swiss Army knife from twenty-seven individual pieces in order to receive their next clue. In Bench Work, teams had to travel to the Promenade de la Treille, where they had to determine how many people could sit on the world's longest wooden bench. Teammates had to measure it by sitting next to each other, alternating down the entire length of the bench. If their answer was within a correct range, teams received their next clue; but if they were incorrect, they had to measure again.
After completing the Detour, teams found their next clue at the Broken Chair statue.
 In this leg's Roadblock, one team member had to identify ten flags from a group of 193, representing ten of the founding members of the United Nations. Teams had to find the ten flags in a book which contained all of the flags, and then present the correct flags to a judge in order to receive their next clue.
{| class="wikitable unsortable" style="text-align:left;"
! scope="col" |Flag
|-
! scope="row" style="text-align:left"| 
|-
! scope="row" style="text-align:left"| 
|-
! scope="row" style="text-align:left"| 
|-
! scope="row" style="text-align:left"| 
|-
! scope="row" style="text-align:left"| 
|-
! scope="row" style="text-align:left"| 
|-
! scope="row" style="text-align:left"| 
|-
! scope="row" style="text-align:left"| 
|-
! scope="row" style="text-align:left"| 
|-
! scope="row" style="text-align:left"| 
|}
After completing the Roadblock, teams had to travel by train to Chamonix, France, and search for the pit stop at the Place du Triangle de l'Amitié.

Leg 5 (France)

Episode 5: "We're Only Doing Freaky Stuff Today" (March 11, 2016)
Prize: A trip for two to Boracay, Philippines (awarded to Tyler & Korey)
Eliminated: Erin & Joslyn
Locations
Chamonix (Place du Triangle de l'Amitié) 
Chamonix (Streets of Chamonix)
 Chamonix (Les Grands Montets Gondola Station & Mont Blanc Massif – Les Grands Montets Summit) 
Chamonix (Planpraz Gondola Station )
 Chamonix (Aiguilles Rouges – Planpraz) 
Chamonix (Place Balmat – Michel-Gabriel Paccard Statue) 
Episode summary
At the beginning of this leg, teams had to search the nearby streets to find a marked vehicle with a specific French license plate. After finding their car, teams directed their driver to drive to the Les Grands Montets Gondola Station, where teams had to ascend to the summit of Les Grands Montets, and once atop the mountain, one team member had to traverse a suspension line and retrieve their next clue from the other side.
 This leg's Detour was a choice between Dynamite or Campsite. In Dynamite, teams had to collect two dynamite sticks, commonly used for avalanche prevention. They then had to traverse down a mountain via ferrata and deliver their dynamite to the mountaineer, who gave them their next clue. In Campsite, teams had to pitch a tent so as to match an example and build a protective snow wall beside the tent in order to receive their next clue.
 In this leg's Roadblock, one team member had to ascend via gondola to Planpraz. They then had to perform a tandem paragliding ride  from the side of the Aiguilles Rouges. Once in the air, they had to spot a yeti waving a French flag. After landing, they were asked which country's flag they saw, and if they answered correctly, they received their next clue.
Teams had to check in at the pit stop: the statue of Michel-Gabriel Paccard in Chamonix.

Leg 6 (France → Armenia)

Episode 6: "Let the Good Times Roll" (April 1, 2016)
Prize: One Express Pass (awarded to Brodie & Kurt)
Locations
Chamonix (Place Balmat – Michel-Gabriel Paccard Statue) 
 Geneva, Switzerland → Yerevan, Armenia
Yerevan (Yerevan Opera Theater)
Yerevan (Yerevan Cascade)
Yerevan (Megerian Carpet Factory  Parvana Restaurant) 
 Yerevan (Republic Square) → Hatsavan (Roadside) 
Garni (Temple of Garni) 
Episode summary
At the beginning of this leg, teams were instructed to fly to Yerevan, Armenia. Once in Yerevan, teams had to travel to the Yerevan Opera Theater, where they had to search for their next clue inside the theater while being treated to a performance of Aram Khachaturian's "Sabre Dance". Teams were then directed to travel on foot to the Yerevan Cascade, where they had to climb 500 steps in order to retrieve their next clue.
 This leg's Detour was a choice between Thread or Bread. In Thread, teams traveled to the Megerian Carpet Factory, where they had to complete a row of 200 stitches on an Armenian carpet while following a pattern in order to receive their next clue. In Bread, teams traveled to the Parvana Restaurant, where they had to roll out dough and bake fifteen traditional pieces of bread called lavash using a tonir, an Armenian underground oven, in order to receive their next clue.
After completing the Detour, teams had to make their way to Republic Square and choose a bus that took them to Hatsavan, overlooking Mount Ararat, where they found their next clue.
 In this leg's Roadblock, one team member had to choose a Lada VAZ-2101 taxi from the roadside along with a driver. They then had to direct the taxi onto a ramp and properly perform an oil change in order to receive their next clue.
Teams had to check in at the pit stop: the Temple of Garni.
Additional notes
There was no elimination at the end of this leg; all teams were instead instructed to continue racing.
Armenian musician Gevorg Dabaghyan appeared as the pit stop greeter in this leg.

Leg 7 (Armenia → Georgia)

Episode 7: "Welcome to Bloody Fingers 101" (April 8, 2016)
Prize: A trip for two to Turks and Caicos (awarded to Zach & Rachel)
Eliminated: Scott & Blair
Locations
 Yerevan → Tbilisi, Georgia
Tbilisi (Freedom Square – St. George Statue)
 Tbilisi (Narikala Fortress → Rike Park )
Mtskheta (Jvari Monastery)
Chardakhi (Iago's Wine)  Mtskheta (Arsekidzis 15) 
Tbilisi (Rustaveli National Theater) 
Tbilisi (Rike Park) 
Episode summary
At the start of this leg, teams were instructed to travel by overnight train to Tbilisi, Georgia. Once there, they had to make their way to Freedom Square and find the St. George Statue in order to receive their next clue. Teams then traveled to the Narikala Fortress, where they had to ride a gondola down to the banks of the Mtkvari River. They then had to go to the Jvari Monastery, where they found their next clue.
 This leg's Detour was a choice between Clean or String. In Clean, teams had to travel to Iago's Wine, where they had to wash out a traditional kvevri clay pot buried in the ground to the satisfaction of the winery owner in order to receive their next clue. In String, teams had to travel to Arsekidzis 15 and thread five strings of twenty hazelnuts to make a traditional churchkhela (a sausage-shaped candy). Teams then had to dip them into a pot to glaze them and hang them up to dry. Once all five strings were approved, teams could receive their next clue.
 In this leg's Roadblock, one team member had to join the Georgian National Ballet and perform a fast-paced routine on stage to the satisfaction of the choreographer in order to receive their next clue.
Teams had to check in at the pit stop: Rike Park, overlooking the Bridge of Peace, in Tbilisi.

Leg 8 (Georgia → United Arab Emirates)

Episode 8: "I Have a Wedgie and a Half" (April 15, 2016)
Prize: A trip for two to Helsinki, Finland (awarded to Brodie & Kurt)
Locations
Tbilisi (Rike Park) 
 Tbilisi → Dubai, United Arab Emirates
Margham (Dubai Desert Conservation Reserve – Bedouin Camp)
Al Lisaili (Dubai Camel Race Track)  Murqquab (Al Maha Desert) 
Palm Jumeirah (Atlantis The Palm – Aquaventure) 
Palm Jumeirah (Atlantis The Palm – Poseidon's Revenge)
 Dubai (Deira Old Souq Station) 
Episode summary
At the beginning of this leg, teams were instructed to fly to Dubai in the United Arab Emirates. Once in Dubai, teams had to drive themselves to a Bedouin camp in the Margham desert, where teams were given their next clue along with a Travelocity Roaming Gnome.
 This leg's Detour was a choice between Races or Oasis. In Races, teams traveled to Dubai Camel Race Track. If teams finished ahead of the camels, they could receive their next clue. In Oasis, teams had to lead four camels across a marked path through the desert to a Bedouin camp, where they were offered traditional regag bread and camel milk along with their next clue.
 In this leg's Roadblock, one team member had to put on a diving helmet and walk through an aquarium containing sharks, rays, and other sea creatures in order to retrieve a canister containing a puzzle. Once they were out of the aquarium, they had to solve the puzzle in order to receive their next clue. 
After completing the Roadblock, teams had to slide down the Poseidon's Revenge water slide at the Aquaventure water park in order to receive their next clue. This was the same water park that teams visited in season 15.
Teams had to travel by boat back to Dubai and then check in at the pit stop: the Deira Old Souq Station.
Additional tasks
Brodie & Kurt used their Express Pass to bypass the Roadblock on this leg.
This was a non-elimination leg.

Leg 9 (United Arab Emirates → Indonesia)

Episode 9: "Salt That Sand!" (April 22, 2016)
Prize:  each (awarded to Tyler & Korey)
Eliminated: Zach & Rachel
Locations
Dubai (Deira Old Souq Station) 
 Dubai → Denpasar, Indonesia
Tabanan (Tanah Lot)
Tabanan (Tanah Lot – Enjung Galuh Temple & Snake Temple)
Klungkung (Banjar Belatung Kusamba Beach) 
Klungkung (Goa Lawah) 
Sanur (Mertasari Beach) 
 Sanur (Semawang Beach – Pinisi ) 
Episode summary
At the beginning of this leg, teams were instructed to fly to Denpasar, on the island of Bali in Indonesia. Once in Bali, teams had to make their way to Tanah Lot and pick one of three departure times the next morning, when each team member had to deliver a religious offering known as a gebogan on their heads to the Enjung Galuh Temple. Once there, they then traded their gebogans for two live pythons, which they had to carry around their necks and deliver to the Snake Temple in order to receive their next clue.
 In this leg's first Roadblock, one team member had to collect seawater in two baskets on a bamboo pole and shake out the water onto a bed of volcanic sand so that it could evaporate. After filling the plot of sand, they then had to scrape enough crystallized salt from the brine troughs to fill a basket. Finally, they had to properly fill four plastic bags with salt in order to receive their next clue.
 In this leg's second Roadblock, the team member who did not perform the previous Roadblock had to properly assemble a  traditional kite and fly it along the beach with a team of kite enthusiasts in order to receive their next clue.
 For their Speed Bump, Sheri & Cole had to go to Goa Lawah Temple and prepare and sell ten bowls of a traditional Indonesian meatball dish known as bakso for Rp10,000 each. Each team member then had to finish a bowl of bakso before they could continue racing.
After completing the second Roadblock, teams had to travel to Semawang Beach and then paddle an outrigger canoe to a traditional pinisi sailing ship, which was the pit stop for this leg.

Leg 10 (Indonesia)

Episode 10: "Monkey Dance!" (April 29, 2016)
Prize: A trip for two on an Alaskan cruise (awarded to Tyler & Korey)
Eliminated: Brodie & Kurt
Locations
Sanur (Semawang Beach – Pinisi ) 
 Nusa Penida (Gamat Bay)
 Nusa Lembongan (Hai Tide Beach Resort – Mushroom Beach)
Nusa Lembongan (Pura Puseh)
Nusa Lembongan (Lembongan–Ceningan Bridge  Seaweed Farm) 
Nusa Lembongan (Warung Sunrise) 
Nusa Lembongan (Hai Tide Beach Resort – Pande Curly Paddleboard Shop)
 Nusa Ceningan (Blue Lagoon) 
 Denpasar (Bajra Sandhi Monument) 
Episode summary
At the start of this leg, teams took a boat to Gamat Bay on the island of Nusa Penida. There, they had to search for their clue inside one of three clue boxes near the corals on the ocean floor. After picking up their clue, teams took a high-speed boat to Mushroom Beach at Hai Tide Beach Resort, and then traveled to Pura Puseh. Before entering the stairway, teams had to wear sarongs on their waist and follow a dancer dressed as a monkey up some stairs, who then gave them their next clue.
 This leg's Detour was a choice between Haul or Harvest. In Haul, teams had to carry a total of fifty coconuts and four live chickens across a congested suspension bridge and load the coconuts into a delivery truck and the chickens into baskets in order to receive their next clue. In Harvest, teams had to propel a canoe through a marked course, where they had to collect enough seaweed to completely cover a tarp on the beach, in order to receive their next clue.
After completing the Detour, teams had to make their way to the Warung Sunrise in order to find their next clue, which directed teams to the Pande Curly Paddleboard Shop.
 In this leg's Roadblock, one team member had to ride a jet ski to the Blue Lagoon, where they climbed a ladder to the top of a four-story high cliff. They then participated in a Pilates session with Bondi Rescue lifeguard Anthony "Harries" Carroll before jumping  into the sea in order to get their next clue.
After completing the Roadblock, teams took a boat back to Bali and then traveled by taxi to the pit stop: the Bajra Sandhi Monument in Denpasar.
Additional notes
 This leg featured a Double U-Turn. Tyler & Korey chose to use the U-Turn on Brodie & Kurt, while Burnie & Ashley chose to use the U-Turn on Tyler & Korey. However, Tyler & Korey had already passed the U-Turn by this point and were therefore unaffected. Burnie & Ashley knew this, but chose to use the U-Turn so as to prevent other teams from being able to use it.

Leg 11 (Indonesia → China)

Episode 11: "That's Money, Honey" (May 6, 2016)
Eliminated: Burnie & Ashley
Locations
Sanur (Pura Dalem Semawa) 
 Denpasar → Shenzhen, China
Shenzhen (Shenzhen Bao'an International Airport – Departure Hall)
 Shenzhen (Shenzhen Bao'an International Airport → Hourui Station)
 Shenzhen (Hourui Station → Window of the World)
Shenzhen (Window of the World – Eiffel Tower) 
 Shenzhen (Window of the World → Grand Theater Station)
Shenzhen (Lychee Park  – Moon Bridge)
Shenzhen (Dafen Oil Painting Village) 
Shenzhen (Shenzhen Library Terrace) 
Episode summary
At the beginning of this leg, teams were instructed to fly to Shenzhen, China. After arriving at Shenzhen Bao'an International Airport, teams had to go to the top floor of the departure hall to find their next clue. Teams were directed to travel to the Eiffel Tower to find their next clue, and had to figure out that it was a replica at the Window of the World.
 In this leg's Roadblock, one team member had to search the grounds of the Window of the World, a park containing replicas of world landmarks, for six specific landmarks that were the answers to riddles given in the clue. At each monument, they had to retrieve a photo sticker and paste it on their provided passport. Once they had all six stickers, they had to show the passport to a park official in order to receive their next clue.
After completing the Roadblock, teams had to travel by subway to Lychee Park and search for the Moon Bridge in order to find their next clue.
 This season's final Detour was a choice between Commuter Cycle or Master of Arts. In Commuter Cycle, teams had to practice riding self-balancing unicycles. They then had to complete a course down a busy street while holding a briefcase and a coffee cup in order to receive the combination to the briefcase, which contained their next clue. In Master of Arts, teams had to search for a plaza filled with painters at the Dafen Oil Painting Village for one who held a marked paintbrush. The painter led them to a shop where they found disassembled pieces of art. After bringing the pieces of art to another shop, they then had to properly install the artwork on a wall in order to receive their next clue.
After completing the Detour, teams received a photo of a building, which they had to figure out was the Shenzhen Civic Center. From there, they had to search the grounds for the pit stop: the terrace of the Shenzhen Library.

Leg 12 (China → United States)

Episode 12: "The Only First That Matters" (May 13, 2016)
Winners: Dana & Matt
Second Place: Sheri & Cole
Third Place: Tyler & Korey
Locations
Shenzhen (Shenzhen Library Terrace) 
 Guangzhou → Los Angeles, California
Los Angeles (Angelus Plaza) 
 Los Angeles → Santa Barbara
Santa Barbara (Santa Barbara Maritime Museum – Theresa Ann)
Santa Barbara (Rattlesnake Canyon – Gibraltar Rock)
Santa Ynez (Grassini Family Vineyards)  
Episode summary
At the beginning of this leg, teams were instructed to fly to Los Angeles, California. Once there, teams had to travel to Angelus Plaza in order to find their next clue.
 In this leg's first Roadblock, one team member had to make their way to the penthouse above Angelus Plaza. If they failed, they had to rappel to the ground and try again, but with each failed attempt, the clue was moved closer to them.
After completing the first Roadblock, teams traveled by helicopter to Santa Barbara. Once there, teams had to travel to the Santa Barbara Maritime Museum and take a marked dinghy into the harbor in order to find the Theresa Ann, where a fisherman on board gave them their next clue.
At Gibraltar Rock, teams had to take part in synchronized mountaineering. One team member traversed horizontally across a suspended line to grab one half of the clue, which caused their partner to simultaneously descend down the face of the cliff to pick up the other half. Once they were reunited, team members had to join the two halves together in order to read their next clue.
 In this season's final Roadblock, the team member who did not perform the previous Roadblock had to arrange wine barrel lids, which featured hashtags that had been printed on teams' clues in previous legs, and then spell the name of each corresponding city in chronological order. Once the hashtags and the cities were correct, teams could receive their final clue.
{| class="wikitable unsortable" style="text-align:center;"
! scope="col" | Hashtag
! scope="col" | City
|-
! scope="row" style="text-align:left"| #MuseoSoumaya
| Mexico City
|-
! scope="row" style="text-align:left"| #WalledCity
| Cartagena
|-
! scope="row" style="text-align:left"| #JetStream
| Geneva
|-
! scope="row" style="text-align:left"| #MontBlanc
| Chamonix
|-
! scope="row" style="text-align:left"| #12thCapital
| Yerevan
|-
! scope="row" style="text-align:left"| #PeaceBridge
| Tbilisi
|-
! scope="row" style="text-align:left"| #WaterSlide
| Dubai
|-
! scope="row" style="text-align:left"| #GatewayToBali
| Denpasar
|-
! scope="row" style="text-align:left"| #ParametricDesign
| Shenzhen
|}
After completing the second Roadblock, teams were instructed to search the grounds of Grassini Family Vineyards for the finish line.

Reception

Critical response
While the casting twist for this season was criticized by long-term fans before the premiere, reviews for The Amazing Race 28 were more mixed. Daniel Fienberg of The Hollywood Reporter wrote that this season was one of multiple recent seasons that "sullied" The Amazing Race. Ken Tucker of Yahoo! called this season "dreadful". Luke Gelineau of TV Equals called this season "an agonizing series of frustrating legs filled with stupid decisions and vapid contestants." Phil Naegely of FanSided wrote that this season "was filled with many memorable moments" and "had drama in each and every leg." Jenni Powell of Tubefilter wrote that this season "was for the most part a very fun ride" and "a very good season."

Ratings
U.S. Nielsen ratings

Canadian ratings
Canadian broadcaster CTV also aired The Amazing Race on Fridays. Episodes aired at 8:00 p.m. Eastern and Central (9:00 p.m. Pacific, Mountain and Atlantic).

Canadian DVR ratings are included in Numeris's count.

References

External links

 28
2016 American television seasons
Television shows filmed in California
Television shows filmed in Alabama
Television shows filmed in Texas
Television shows filmed in Georgia (U.S. state)
Television shows filmed in Mexico
Television shows filmed in Colombia
Television shows filmed in Switzerland
Television shows filmed in France
Television shows filmed in Greece
Television shows filmed in Armenia
Television shows filmed in Georgia (country)
Television shows filmed in the United Arab Emirates
Television shows filmed in Indonesia
Television shows filmed in China